

Description 
Notopleura uliginosa is a plant from the genus Notopleura. It was first described by Cornelis Eliza Bertus Bremekamp in 1934.

Range 
Its range extends from Mexico to Bolivia and to the east from the Antilles to The Guianas, as reported in the Global Biodiversity Information Facility.

References 

Palicoureeae